Ken Skupski and Neal Skupski were the defending champions, but lost in the semifinals to Tomasz Bednarek and Igor Zelenay.

Dustin Brown and Jan-Lennard Struff won the title by defeating  Tomasz Bednarek and Igor Zelenay 6–2, 6–4 in the final.

Seeds

Draw

Draw

References
 Main Draw

Pekao Szczecin Open - Doubles
2014 Doubles
2014 in Polish tennis